Ock Joo-hyun (sometimes spelled Ock Ju-hyun; born March 20, 1980) is a South Korean singer and musical theatre actress, known mostly for her role as the lead singer of the South Korean girl group Fin.K.L. After their unofficial breakup in 2002, Ock released three solo albums and has participated in musicals, namely Wicked, Aida, Chicago, Cats, 42nd Street, and The Count of Monte Cristo.

Career

As a member of Fin.K.L 

Fin.K.L debuted in 1998 with DSP Entertainment and quickly became popular, catapulting all its members into stardom. Ock served as the lead singer for Fin.K.L until it became inactive as a group in 2002; she has since taken part in Fin.K.L's digital single "Fine Killing Liberty" in fall of 2005, including filming the music video.

Solo music 
Starting her solo career summer in 2003, Ock came out with a ballad called "난..." ("Nan...", meaning "I..."), which entered the top 10 of Korean music charts. By her second album, which came out late fall in 2004, the public was startled by the sudden change in appearance, as she had experienced a significant weight loss; Ock attributed to her intense yoga training. Her popularity rose and she was able to perform on various music shows for a lengthy period with her singles "Catch" and "Sweet Rainyday".

Her third album, titled Remind, was released on June 12, 2008 The first single off the album is "Honey", which is a departure from her previous singles as it incorporates R&B. She began her comeback performances the following weekend on the major TV music shows.

Her next album, "Reflection" was released in 2013. In 2014, Ock partnered with musical composer and director Frank Wildhorn, with whom she worked together in the musical "Monte Cristo", to release an English language album titled "Gold" with popular musical numbers.

Other works 
In addition to launching three albums, Ock has worked as a radiostation DJ for MBC, and as an MC for Korean networks SBS, MBC, and KBS. She has also received an award for "Best Radio DJ" during the MBC awards of 2005. She obtained the main role in the Korean version of Tim Rice's musical Aida, starting on August 27, 2005.

Ock has also done television work as a permanent member on various variety shows. In addition to being one of the main girls on Heroine 5, she was a part of Goldfish, an MBC TV show, in 2006. She was featured in the first season of MBC's reality program, "I am a Singer" with other veteran stars of Korean music. She was voted first place for her rendition of "1000 days", and also sang Korean ballad "Love is Gone", "Man is Ship, Woman is Harbor" and a re-make of fellow Fin.K.L member Lee Hyori's "U-Go Girl".

Ock has continued to further her "yoga celebrity" career, even helping to open up a yoga studio. She also released her own yoga VHS, DVD. More recently she published a new book about maintaining fitness of mind and body.

In March 2009, it was revealed that Ock would be teaching classes in music at Dong Seoul College.
She also appeared in Tony Hawk's pro skater 2 as a playable character.

Musical actor 
Ock has received much success as one of the most popular leading ladies of Korean musical theater. Often, she is described as a charismatic leading lady with high ticket power. Today she is renowned almost more for her presence as a musical actress than her days as a pop-icon and singer.

She debuted in the role of Aida as the lead role in 2005. Many praised her strong vocals but were intensely critical of acting as well as her status as a former k-pop idol. When she returned to the role again in 2010 she fell ill and was unable to make one of the shows. The production only featured a single cast and no understudies or standbys were used during the run. Due to this, the show was cancelled and many people complained at the oversight of the situation; Ock was also blamed for the incident despite the company being at fault. The following year she starred in Chicago and was met with better reviews saying that her acting had improved.
In 2010, she appeared in the Count of Monte Cristo in the main role of Mercedes. She appeared as the leading female role in the Korean adaptation of Das Musical: Elisabeth, opposite JYJ's Junsu in 2012. She received a Best Actress Golden Ticket Award and Korean Musical Award for this role. She followed these acclaimed adaptations of European musical theater into a new role as "Mrs. Danvers" in the musical "Rebecca," inspired by Hitchcock's movie of the same name. Playing a slightly unhinged and dark character, Ock showed a new side of herself and was rewarded with great popularity among audiences and received the 2013 Korean Musical Award for Best Actress in a supporting role.

In 2014, Ock starred as Elphaba in the first Korean production of "Wicked the Musical" and also reprises the role of Danvers in "Rebecca" due to its popularity in South Korea. Starting in November 2014 Ock began her role as Marie Antoinette, in the musical Marie Antoinette at Charlotte Theater in Seoul, South Korea.

In 2016, Ock starred in her first original role with Mata Hari. It was also the first original musical from EMK Musical Company which was created in collaboration with Frank Wildhorn. He had stated that she had been one of the main inspirations for the character and songs of Mata Hari, and had sung high praises of her performances in his other musicals such as The Count of Monte Cristo. She later reprised her role in the 2017 production which had since been revised.

In 2018, Ock was cast as Anna Karenina (along with Jeong Sun Ah) for the Korean premiere. Prior to that, she travelled to Russia to meet the cast and crew of the Russian production that was opening before her own run. She appeared at the curtain call for opening night, and sang a trio with Ekaterina Guseva (Anna Karenina) and Sergey Lee (Alexey Vronsky).

In February 2022, OCK has decided not to renew the contract with Potluck Co., Ltd.

Theatre 

* Note: Most, if not all, large scale Korean Musicals are generally double or triple cast for a role. The actors share the role equally and alternate throughout the eight show week.

Concerts

Video game appearances 
Ock Joo-hyun is a playable character in the video game Tony Hawk's Pro Skater 2 (only in the South Korean PC version).

Filmography

Television shows

Radio shows

Personal life 
Ock graduated from Kyung Hee University with Sung Yuri and Gong Yoo in February 2005. She is currently signed with Potluck.

Allegedly Ock had revealed herself to be in a long-term relationship with Jeff Chang, son of Korean media mogul. The relationship was said to have started in 2006, however when she mentions him at the awards show where she thanked him, she refers to him as "a friend of mine". It's inferred that they have since broken up and she is not in a relationship with anyone currently. In the director's cut of the Fin.K.L. Camping Club variety show she stated that she didn't want to get married when her fellow members asked about her thoughts.

Awards and nominations

Notes

References

External links 
  
 

Fin.K.L members
South Korean women pop singers
South Korean musical theatre actresses
South Korean television presenters
South Korean women television presenters
South Korean female idols
South Korean television actresses
South Korean radio presenters
People from Seoul
1980 births
Living people
DSP Media artists
Uiryeong Ok clan
South Korean women radio presenters